Lu Yi (born 6 January 1976) is a Chinese actor and pop singer.

Lu ranked 38th on Forbes China Celebrity 100 list in 2015, and 47th in 2017.

Early life
Lu Yi was born in Shanghai, China. He made his debut in the film "Spring Ding-dong" when he was five years old. Since then, Lu has acted in many films and television series. In Grade 8, Lu began to learn Peking Opera and Chinese Kung Fu. At the age of 14, Lu was admitted to the Shanghai Children Art Theatre, and has appeared in more than 70 stage plays.

Career
Lu made his debut in the television series, Never Close the Eye. Then still a student at Shanghai Theatre Academy, Lu was launched to national stardom. He won the Best Actor and Most Popular Actor awards in the Golden Eagle Awards.

His following works established his position in the industry. In 2001, he starred in the popular period piece Love Story in Shanghai and played Bao Jingtian in historical drama Young Justice Bao II. The subsequent year, he won the Best Actor award at the Top Ten China TV Arts for his performance in the youth drama Field of Dreams. His 2003 drama, Boy & Girl which co-stars Ruby Lin became the highest rated drama of the year. Lu also ventured to films, starring in romantic film Fall in Love at First Sight (2002) alongside Fan Bingbing and A Time to Love with Zhao Wei – both earned him nominations at prestigious award ceremonies such as the Hundred Flowers Award and Changchun Film Festival. Lu also featured in Tsui Hark's wuxia film Seven Swords.

Lu's following works were successful, and established him as one of China's premier actors. He starred in wuxia series Eight Heroes, sports racing drama Fast Track Love as well as Harbin under the Curtain of Night, which became a surprise hit and Lu impressed many with his portrayal of a tough worker. In 2009, Lu starred in the popular idol drama My Youthfulness.

From 2010, Lu tried to break out of his idol mold by taking on more serious roles. He starred as Zhuge Liang in the historical drama Three Kingdoms (2010) directed by Gao Xixi, which received widespread acclaim. He also played Su Dongpo in the biopic of the same name, which was released in 2012. The series received positive reviews, and was named one of the Outstanding Television Series by SAFRT. The same year, he won the Golden Phoenix Awards for his performance in the war film The Sino-Japanese War at Sea 1894.

However from 2013 to 2015, Lu returned to his idol drama roots. He starred in historical romance series Palace 3: The Lost Daughter (2014) with Mabel Yuan and Love Yunge from the Desert (2015) with Angelababy. Both series earned high ratings and Lu experienced a rise in popularity.

In 2017, Lu starred in the hit political drama In the Name of People. He played the protagonist, a detective who unearthed corruption within a fictional Chinese city. The drama broke ratings record in China and was even featured in BBC News. He won the Best Actor in the revolutionary era drama genre at the Huading Awards for his performance.

In 2019, Lu starred in the spy drama Lie Xiao.

Personal life
Lu Yi married actress Bao Lei in 2006 after a long time of dating since college. They have 2 daughters.

Filmography

Film

Television series

Discography

Albums

Singles

Awards and nominations

References

External links
 

1976 births
Male actors from Shanghai
Living people
Shanghai Theatre Academy alumni
Chinese male television actors
Chinese male film actors
Chinese male child actors
Chinese male stage actors
Participants in Chinese reality television series
Singers from Shanghai
Chinese Mandopop singers
20th-century Chinese male actors
21st-century Chinese male actors
21st-century Chinese male singers
Affiliated Chinese Opera School of Shanghai Theatre Academy alumni